Linda Sue Park (born March 25, 1960) is a Korean-American author who published her first novel, Seesaw Girl, in 1999. She has written six children's novels and five picture books. Park's work achieved prominence when she received the prestigious 2002 Newbery Medal for her novel A Single Shard. She has written the ninth book in The 39 Clues, Storm Warning, published on May 25, 2010.

Personal life
Linda Sue Park was born on March 25, 1960 in Urbana, Illinois and was raised outside Chicago. Linda Sue Park's parents immigrated to the United States in the 1950s, for their education. Park has been writing poetry and stories since the age of four. Park published her first poem when she was nine years old for Trailblazer magazine. Through elementary and high school, she continued to publish poems in magazines for children and young people. She published her first book in 1999, Seesaw Girl.

Park competed on the gymnastics team at Stanford University and graduated with a high degree in English. She also obtained advanced degrees in literature from Trinity College in Ireland and also from the University of London.

Before writing her first book, Park worked at many jobs, including public relations for a major oil firm, food journalism for British magazines and newspapers, and teaching English as a second language to college students.

Park lives with her family in Rochester, New York

Themes
Park is best known for her historical fiction. With the exception of three picture books and two novels, all of Park's books center upon Korean history and Korean culture. Her first three novels are set in ancient or medieval Korea. However, her fourth novel, When My Name Was Keoko, is about the more recent history of the Japanese occupation of Korea during World War II. Project Mulberry occurs in a contemporary setting outside Chicago. Park's book, Archer’s Quest, introduces a historical figure into modern times. Park shares her passion for baseball in her book, Keeping Score.  Park's book, A Long Walk to Water, features family friend Salva Dut and his childhood experience growing up in the Sudan as well as another character, Nya who spends her entire day gathering and transporting water to her family.

Park researched her Korean heritage for her books, demonstrated by historical details within the story along with sections for author's notes and bibliographies. Her topics feature characteristic elements of Korean culture, including: embroidery (Seesaw Girl); kite fighting (The Kite Fighters); celadon pottery (A Single Shard); silkworms (Project Mulberry); Korean food (Bee-Bim Bop); and archery (Archer’s Quest). She also continues to publish poetry.

Works

Novels
 Seesaw Girl (1999)
 The Kite Fighters (2000)
Junior Library Guild Selection, Spring 2000
Notable Books for a Global Society
Bank Street Best Children's Book of the Year
A Single Shard (2001)
Newbery Medal 2002
Asian/Pacific American Awards for Literature Honorable Mention
When My Name Was Keoko (2002)
Jane Addams Honor citation
Publishers Weekly Best Books of the Year
School Library Journal Best Books of the Year
Project Mulberry (2005)
Chicago Tribune Young Adult Fiction Award
Asian/Pacific American Awards for Literature, Honorable Mention
Archer's Quest (2006)
Click: One novel ten authors, chapter one (2007)
Keeping Score (2008)
Storm Warning (2010), 39 Clues series
A Long Walk to Water (2010)
The Chronicles of Harris Burdick (The Harp, 2011), contributor, Illus. by Chris Van Allsburg
Trust No One (2012), 39 Clues series
Forest of Wonders (2016), Wing and Claw trilogy, Illus. by Jennifer Black Reinhardt
Cavern of Secrets (2017), Wing and Claw trilogy, Illus. by Jim Madsen
Beast of Stone (2018), Wing and Claw trilogy, Illus. by Jim Madsen
Prairie Lotus (2020)

Picture books 
 Mung-Mung: A Foldout Book of Animal Sounds (2004), Illus. by Diane Bigda
 The Firekeeper's Son (2004), Illus. by Julie Downing
 Irma S. and James H. Black (ISB) Honor, 2005
Asian/Pacific American Awards for Literature, Best Illustration in Children's Literature
 Yum! Yuck! A Foldout Book of People Sounds From Around the World (2005), Co-authored by Julia Durango, Illus. by Sue Ramá
ALA Notable Children's Books, 2006
 Bee-bim Bop (2005), Illus. by Ho Baek Lee
 What Does Bunny See? A Book of Colors and Flowers (2005), Illus. by Maggie Smith
 Tap Dancing on the Roof: Sijo Poems (2007), Illus. by Istvan Banyai
 The Lion and the Unicorn Prize for Excellence in North American Poetry
 ABC Children's Booksellers Choice Award
 The Third Gift (2011), Illus. by Bagram Ibatoulline
 Xander's Panda Party (2013), Illus. by Matt Phelan
 Yaks Yak: Animal Word Pairs (2016), Illus. by Jennifer Black Reinhardt

Poetry
 "On Meeting a Poet," "Changing the Sheets," "Mobius," " Fourth-Grade Science Project," in Avatar Review
 "Handstand", in Atlanta Review, Spring/Summer 2000
 "Seven Sins: Portrait of an Aristocratic Young Woman," "Irreversible Loyalty," "A Little World," "The Ramparts at Calvi," in The Alsop Review
 "Armchair Journey," "Hyphen," in Miller's Pond, Spring 2002
 "Picturing the Words," "When the Last Panda Died," "Tide Pool," in Avatar Review, Summer 2004

See also

References

External links

Official website

 

1960 births
Living people
American writers of Korean descent
American children's writers
American child writers
Newbery Medal winners
Jeopardy! contestants
Stanford University alumni
American novelists of Asian descent
20th-century American novelists
21st-century American novelists
20th-century American women writers
21st-century American women writers
American women children's writers
American women novelists